Praxis is the name of an experimental rock project, led by producer/bassist Bill Laswell and featuring guitarist Buckethead and drummer Brain in nearly every incarnation of the band.

The group worked with many other artists such as Serj Tankian from System of a Down, Iggy Pop, DXT and DJ Disk.

Biography

Early days
Bill Laswell initially used the name Praxis for an experimental solo EP recorded for Celluloid Records in 1984, simply named "1984".

1992–1996
The band's debut album, Transmutation (Mutatis Mutandis), released in 1992, was well received by critics. Praxis was composed of guitarist Buckethead, keyboardist Bernie Worrell, drummer Brain,  bassist Bootsy Collins and Afrika Baby Bam as "AF Next Man Flip" on turntables. Bill Laswell masterminded the project and served as producer and co-writer of much of the album's material. Praxis combined elements of different musical genres such as funk, jazz, hip-hop and heavy metal into highly improvised music. The P-Funk-inspired track "Animal Behavior," with a lead vocal from Collins, was released as a single. A video was also shot for the track.

Their next studio album, Sacrifist, was released two years later on the new Laswell-led label Subharmonic and featured a rotating roster of guests including sax player John Zorn, drummer Mick Harris from Painkiller, and members of the band Blind Idiot God. The death metal-influenced album was not as acclaimed as their debut.

The same year saw the album Metatron, with a trio of Buckethead, Laswell and Brain, which included the song "Wake the Dead."

In 1996 the band toured Europe and recorded two live albums called Live in Poland and Transmutation Live containing material from shows in Zürich and Warsaw. Both albums featured members of the Invisibl Skratch Piklz. After the shows, the project broke up.

1997–2004
In 1997, Bill Laswell re-released his Material EP 1984 under the Praxis name. This was followed by the album Mold with Pat Thrall, Peter Wetherbee and Alex Haas instead of Buckethead, Brain and Bernie Worrell respectively. The album was essentially somewhat of a remix album with Wetherbee and crew taking elements from 1984 and crafting a full-length release. Laswell's involvement with this album was minimal. In 1998, Laswell contributed "Dreadnot" to the compilation Abstract Depressionism. Though labeled a Praxis track, this was essentially a solo Laswell creation.

In the same year a first compilation album also containing two songs from the Death Cube K album Dreamatorium (Death Cube K is an anagram of Buckethead) was made available.
 
In 1999, a re-worked version of Live in Poland was released as Warszawa. Little was heard of the band for the next years, while Brain and Buckethead played for Guns N' Roses and Laswell concentrated more on his dub releases.

2004–2010
Most original members reunited for a small tour in 2004 culminating in their appearance as part of a Bill Laswell themed episode of the PBS series Soundstage. Laswell also began working on their next studio album Profanation (Preparation for a Coming Darkness), but due to the label (Sanctuary) going broke the project was put on hold for about three years.

In 2005 Transmutation Live was re-worked and re-released as Zurich.
Another live album called Tennessee 2004 was released in 2007 which was a truncated version of a longer show performed at the Bonnarroo festival.

On January 1, 2008 the studio album Profanation (Preparation for a Coming Darkness) was released in Japan with guest contributions by Serj Tankian, Mike Patton and Iggy Pop as well as Buckethead's old friend Maximum Bob and many more.

2011–present: Hiatus and Sound Virus
In early 2011, Profanation was re-released on Bill Laswell's new M.O.D. Technologies label with two additional live tracks. Later that month Bill Laswell stated in an interview that there was likely no more future for the band:

M.O.D. Technologies also has a vinyl version of Profanation scheduled for an April 2013 release.

In 2015, the band released a new album entitled "Sound Virus".

In 2022, Bill Laswell, Buckethead and Brain returned to the stage as Praxis to play two shows in New York.

Notable guests 
The following musicians have contributed to the various Praxis experiments (though arguably, those appearing on "Mold" are not proper collaborators as this album is only tenuously part of the Praxis canon):

Afrika Baby Bam as AF Next Man Flip on turntables
Cindy Blackman on drums
Bootsy Collins on bass and vocals
DJ Disk on turntables
DXT on turntables
Yamatsuka Eye on vocals
Mick Harris on drums
Lili Haydn on violin
Invisibl Skratch Piklz on turntables
Toshinori Kondo on trumpet
Maximum Bob on vocals
Mike Patton on vocals
Iggy Pop on vocals
Serj Tankian on vocals
Pat Thrall on guitars
John Zorn on saxophone

Musical styles 
Between the influence of Laswell and Buckethead, Praxis' musical experimentation in both studio, street and live settings have combined elements of mid-1970s Funkadelic & Miles Davis, hip-hop's more avant-garde leanings, and Last Exit's ferocious yet organic jazz/metal aesthetic. Many of these experiments defined diverse, eclectic, and freeform genres including avant-garde, heavy metal, funk and jazz-fusion.

Discography

Studio albums
1992: Transmutation (Mutatis Mutandis)
1993: Sacrifist
1994: Metatron
1998: Mold
2008: Profanation (Preparation for a Coming Darkness)

Singles
1992: Animal Behavior

EPs and compilations
1984: 1984
1992: A Taste of Mutation
1998: Collection
2015: Sound Virus

Live
1997: Live in Poland
1997: Transmutation Live
1999: Warszawa
2005: Zurich
2007: Tennessee 2004

References

External links 
 Bill Laswell's website

American funk metal musical groups
Buckethead
Island Records artists
Musical groups established in 1992
Musical groups disestablished in 2011
ROIR artists